The 1939 Philadelphia Phillies season was a season in Major League Baseball. The Phillies finished eighth in the National League with a record of 45 wins and 106 losses.

Offseason 
 December 7, 1938: Les Powers was purchased by the Phillies from the New York Giants.

Regular season

Season standings

Record vs. opponents

Notable transactions 
 April 8, 1939: Pete Sivess and cash was traded by the Phillies to the New York Yankees for Len Gabrielson.

Game log 

|- style="background:#bbb"
| – || April 18 || @ Bees || colspan=6 | Postponed (rain); Makeup: July 9 as a traditional double-header
|- style="background:#fbb"
| 1 || April 19  || @ Bees || 6–7  || Bill Posedel (1–0) || Max Butcher (0–1) || None || 1,501 || 0–1
|- style="background:#bbb"
| – || April 19  || @ Bees || colspan=6 | Postponed (rain); Makeup: August 16 as a traditional double-header
|- style="background:#fbb"
| 2 || April 20 || @ Bees || 0–2 || Lou Fette (1–0) || Syl Johnson (0–1) || None || 3,166 || 0–2
|- style="background:#fffdd0"
| 3 || April 21 || Dodgers || 2–2  || None || None || None || 2,500 || 0–2–1
|- style="background:#bfb"
| 4 || April 22 || Dodgers || 5–4 || Elmer Burkart (1–0) || Red Evans (0–2) || None || 3,000 || 1–2–1
|- style="background:#bfb"
| 5 || April 23 || Dodgers || 5–4  || Boom-Boom Beck (1–0) || Hugh Casey (0–1) || None || 8,000 || 2–2–1
|- style="background:#bfb"
| 6 || April 24 || Giants || 6–5 || Max Butcher (1–1) || Slick Castleman (0–1) || Boom-Boom Beck (1) || 3,000 || 3–2–1
|- style="background:#bfb"
| 7 || April 25 || Giants || 8–1 || Claude Passeau (1–0) || Cliff Melton (0–2) || Jim Henry (1) || 3,500 || 4–2–1
|- style="background:#bbb"
| – || April 26 || Giants || colspan=6 | Postponed (rain); Makeup: August 20 as a traditional double-header
|- style="background:#fbb"
| 8 || April 27 || Bees || 4–5 || Danny MacFayden (2–0) || Al Hollingsworth (0–1) || Tom Earley (1) || 8,000 || 4–3–1
|- style="background:#bbb"
| – || April 28 || Bees || colspan=6 | Postponed (rain); Makeup: July 2 as a traditional double-header
|- style="background:#fbb"
| 9 || April 29 || @ Dodgers || 0–5 || Whit Wyatt (1–0) || Hugh Mulcahy (0–1) || None || 8,576 || 4–4–1
|- style="background:#fbb"
| 10 || April 30 || @ Dodgers || 1–3 || Luke Hamlin (3–0) || Max Butcher (1–2) || None || 20,583 || 4–5–1
|-

|- style="background:#fbb"
| 11 || May 1 || @ Dodgers || 12–13 || Whit Wyatt (2–0) || Jim Henry (0–1) || None || 8,063 || 4–6–1
|- style="background:#bfb"
| 12 || May 2 || Cubs || 6–1 || Syl Johnson (1–1) || Ray Harrell (0–1) || None || 1,500 || 5–6–1
|- style="background:#bfb"
| 13 || May 3 || Cubs || 4–1 || Hugh Mulcahy (1–1) || Earl Whitehill (1–1) || None || 1,500 || 6–6–1
|- style="background:#fbb"
| 14 || May 4 || Pirates || 4–6 || Russ Bauers (1–0) || Max Butcher (1–3) || None || 3,500 || 6–7–1
|- style="background:#fbb"
| 15 || May 5 || Pirates || 7–10 || Rip Sewell (2–1) || Al Hollingsworth (0–2) || Mace Brown (2) || 2,000 || 6–8–1
|- style="background:#bfb"
| 16 || May 6 || Pirates || 1–0 || Claude Passeau (2–0) || Mace Brown (0–2) || None || 7,000 || 7–8–1
|- style="background:#fbb"
| 17 || May 7 || Reds || 4–13 || Paul Derringer (3–0) || Hugh Mulcahy (1–2) || None || 18,046 || 7–9–1
|- style="background:#bfb"
| 18 || May 8 || Reds || 8–7 || Max Butcher (2–3) ||  || Boom-Boom Beck (2) || 2,313 || 8–9–1
|- style="background:#fbb"
| 19 || May 9 || Reds || 4–8 || Lee Grissom (1–1) || Hugh Mulcahy (1–3) || Peaches Davis (1) || 2,239 || 8–10–1
|- style="background:#fbb"
| 20 || May 10 || Cardinals || 3–4 || Lon Warneke (3–1) || Claude Passeau (2–1) || Bob Bowman (1) || 7,000 || 8–11–1
|- style="background:#bbb"
| – || May 11 || Cardinals || colspan=6 | Postponed (rain); Makeup: June 10 as a traditional double-header
|- style="background:#bfb"
| 21 || May 12 || @ Giants || 10–6 || Syl Johnson (2–1) || Dick Coffman (1–1) || Hugh Mulcahy (1) || 5,995 || 9–11–1
|- style="background:#bbb"
| – || May 13 || @ Giants || colspan=6 | Postponed (rain); Makeup: August 13 as a traditional double-header
|- style="background:#fbb"
| 22 || May 14 || @ Giants || 1–2  || Carl Hubbell (1–0) || Max Butcher (2–4) || None || 22,485 || 9–12–1
|- style="background:#fbb"
| 23 || May 16 || @ Pirates || 5–8 || Joe Bowman (1–1) || Claude Passeau (2–2) || None || 1,823 || 9–13–1
|- style="background:#bfb"
| 24 || May 17 || @ Pirates || 7–3 || Hugh Mulcahy (2–3) || Bob Klinger (2–4) || None || 2,075 || 10–13–1
|- style="background:#fbb"
| 25 || May 18 || @ Pirates || 4–5  || Jim Tobin (3–2) || Al Hollingsworth (0–3) || None || 2,183 || 10–14–1
|- style="background:#fbb"
| 26 || May 19 || @ Reds || 3–4  || Paul Derringer (4–1) || Max Butcher (2–5) || None || 3,167 || 10–15–1
|- style="background:#fbb"
| 27 || May 20 || @ Reds || 2–7 || Whitey Moore (4–3) || Claude Passeau (2–3) || None || 5,608 || 10–16–1
|- style="background:#fbb"
| 28 || May 21 || @ Cardinals || 2–5 || Bob Bowman (2–1) || Hugh Mulcahy (2–4) || None || 7,663 || 10–17–1
|- style="background:#fbb"
| 29 || May 22 || @ Cardinals || 1–2 || Mort Cooper (1–1) || Al Hollingsworth (0–4) || Curt Davis (3) || 1,065 || 10–18–1
|- style="background:#fbb"
| 30 || May 23 || @ Cardinals || 1–6 || Bill McGee (3–0) || Max Butcher (2–6) || None || 1,347 || 10–19–1
|- style="background:#fbb"
| 31 || May 24 || @ Cubs || 2–3 || Larry French (3–2) || Claude Passeau (2–4) || None || 4,658 || 10–20–1
|- style="background:#bfb"
| 32 || May 25 || @ Cubs || 8–7 || Hugh Mulcahy (3–4) || Vance Page (2–2) || Syl Johnson (1) || 5,015 || 11–20–1
|- style="background:#fbb"
| 33 || May 27 || Giants || 1–10 || Hal Schumacher (3–3) || Al Hollingsworth (0–5) || None || 2,500 || 11–21–1
|- style="background:#fbb"
| 34 || May 28 || Giants || 2–7 || Bill Lohrman (2–2) || Max Butcher (2–7) || None || 4,425 || 11–22–1
|- style="background:#fbb"
| 35 || May 29 || Giants || 5–7 || Manny Salvo (2–2) || Al Hollingsworth (0–6) || None || 3,000 || 11–23–1
|- style="background:#fbb"
| 36 || May 30  || Bees || 7–9  || Joe Sullivan (1–1) || Boom-Boom Beck (1–1) || None ||  || 11–24–1
|- style="background:#bfb"
| 37 || May 30  || Bees || 5–3 || Syl Johnson (3–1) || Bill Posedel (3–3) || None || 19,263 || 12–24–1
|-

|- style="background:#fbb"
| 38 || June 1 || Pirates || 2–5 || Rip Sewell (6–3) || Kirby Higbe (2–2) || None || 8,000 || 12–25–1
|- style="background:#fbb"
| 39 || June 3 || Pirates || 7–10 || Mace Brown (1–2) || Al Hollingsworth (0–7) || Bill Swift (1) || 2,000 || 12–26–1
|- style="background:#fbb"
| 40 || June 4  || Cubs || 4–9 || Jack Russell (1–0) || Hugh Mulcahy (3–5) || None || 4,000 || 12–27–1
|- style="background:#bbb"
| – || June 4  || Cubs || colspan=6 | Postponed (rain and Sunday curfew); Makeup: August 27 as a traditional double-header
|- style="background:#bfb"
| 41 || June 5 || Cubs || 8–7 || Kirby Higbe (3–2) || Larry French (4–3) || Hugh Mulcahy (2) || 1,500 || 13–27–1
|- style="background:#bfb"
| 42 || June 6 || Cubs || 9–8 || Boom-Boom Beck (2–1) || Gene Lillard (2–4) || None || 1,000 || 14–27–1
|- style="background:#fbb"
| 43 || June 7 || Reds || 4–5 || Whitey Moore (7–4) || Max Butcher (2–8) || None || 3,305 || 14–28–1
|- style="background:#fbb"
| 44 || June 8 || Reds || 2–3 || Paul Derringer (8–1) || Hugh Mulcahy (3–6) || None || 16,123 || 14–29–1
|- style="background:#bfb"
| 45 || June 10  || Cardinals || 6–5 || Kirby Higbe (4–2) || Clyde Shoun (0–1) || None ||  || 15–29–1
|- style="background:#bfb"
| 46 || June 10  || Cardinals || 5–3 || Ray Harrell (1–2) || Bob Weiland (3–5) || Hugh Mulcahy (3) || 7,000 || 16–29–1
|- style="background:#bfb"
| 47 || June 11  || Cardinals || 5–4  || Boom-Boom Beck (3–1) || Bill McGee (5–1) || None ||  || 17–29–1
|- style="background:#fbb"
| 48 || June 11  || Cardinals || 1–4 || Lon Warneke (7–2) || Al Hollingsworth (0–8) || Mort Cooper (3) || 17,047 || 17–30–1
|- style="background:#fbb"
| 49 || June 14 || @ Reds || 7–10 || Gene Thompson (2–1) || Gene Schott (0–1) || Whitey Moore (3) || 5,175 || 17–31–1
|- style="background:#fbb"
| 50 || June 15 || @ Reds || 1–4 || Bucky Walters (9–4) || Hugh Mulcahy (3–7) || None || 26,616 || 17–32–1
|- style="background:#bfb"
| 51 || June 17 || @ Pirates || 11–2 || Syl Johnson (4–1) || Rip Sewell (6–6) || None || 3,741 || 18–32–1
|- style="background:#bbb"
| – || June 18  || @ Pirates || colspan=6 | Postponed (rain); Makeup: July 26 as a traditional double-header
|- style="background:#bbb"
| – || June 18  || @ Pirates || colspan=6 | Postponed (rain); Makeup: September 17 as a traditional double-header
|- style="background:#bbb"
| – || June 20 || @ Cardinals || colspan=6 | Postponed (rain); Makeup: August 6 as a traditional double-header
|- style="background:#fbb"
| 52 || June 21 || @ Cardinals || 2–14 || Curt Davis (9–6) || Hugh Mulcahy (3–8) || None || 1,359 || 18–33–1
|- style="background:#fbb"
| 53 || June 22 || @ Cardinals || 5–11 || Mort Cooper (2–3) || Boom-Boom Beck (3–2) || None || 1,025 || 18–34–1
|- style="background:#fbb"
| 54 || June 23 || @ Cubs || 3–4 || Bill Lee (7–8) || Max Butcher (2–9) || None || 6,762 || 18–35–1
|- style="background:#bfb"
| 55 || June 24 || @ Cubs || 1–0 || Hugh Mulcahy (4–8) || Charlie Root (0–2) || None || 8,574 || 19–35–1
|- style="background:#fbb"
| 56 || June 25 || @ Cubs || 3–4 || Claude Passeau (5–7) || Kirby Higbe (4–3) || None || 14,388 || 19–36–1
|- style="background:#fbb"
| 57 || June 27 || @ Giants || 5–13 || Hal Schumacher (6–5) || Max Butcher (2–10) || None || 6,139 || 19–37–1
|- style="background:#fbb"
| 58 || June 28 || @ Giants || 1–7 || Bill Lohrman (6–3) || Hugh Mulcahy (4–9) || None || 6,556 || 19–38–1
|- style="background:#bbb"
| – || June 29 || @ Dodgers || colspan=6 | Postponed (rain and wet grounds); Makeup: June 30
|- style="background:#bbb"
| – || June 30 || @ Dodgers || colspan=6 | Postponed (rain); Makeup: September 6
|-

|- style="background:#fbb"
| 59 || July 1 || Bees || 0–6 || Bill Posedel (7–5) || Max Butcher (2–11) || None || 1,000 || 19–39–1
|- style="background:#fbb"
| 60 || July 2  || Bees || 7–9 || Dick Errickson (2–5) || Boom-Boom Beck (3–3) || Milt Shoffner (1) ||  || 19–40–1
|- style="background:#fbb"
| 61 || July 2  || Bees || 3–4 || Johnny Lanning (3–2) || Syl Johnson (4–2) || Fred Frankhouse (3) || 7,502 || 19–41–1
|- style="background:#fbb"
| 62 || July 4  || @ Dodgers || 3–6 || Tot Pressnell (4–3) || Al Hollingsworth (0–9) || None ||  || 19–42–1
|- style="background:#fbb"
| 63 || July 4  || @ Dodgers || 6–8 || Hugh Casey (4–3) || Ike Pearson (0–1) || None || 21,299 || 19–43–1
|- style="background:#fbb"
| 64 || July 5 || @ Dodgers || 1–7 ||  || Kirby Higbe (4–4) || None || 3,536 || 19–44–1
|- style="background:#fbb"
| 65 || July 7 || @ Bees || 3–7 || Bill Posedel (8–5) || Boom-Boom Beck (3–4) || None || 1,768 || 19–45–1
|- style="background:#fbb"
| 66 || July 8 || @ Bees || 0–4 || Lou Fette (9–3) || Syl Johnson (4–3) || None || 1,307 || 19–46–1
|- style="background:#bfb"
| 67 || July 9  || @ Bees || 3–1 || Kirby Higbe (5–4) || Danny MacFayden (6–7) || None ||  || 20–46–1
|- style="background:#bfb"
| 68 || July 9  || @ Bees || 7–6 || Al Hollingsworth (1–9) || Johnny Lanning (3–3) || Boom-Boom Beck (3) || 10,634 || 21–46–1
|- style="background:#bbcaff;"
| – || July 11 ||colspan="7" | 1939 Major League Baseball All-Star Game at Yankee Stadium in New York
|- style="background:#fbb"
| 69 || July 13 || Cubs || 5–7 || Vance Page (4–2) || Boom-Boom Beck (3–5) || None || 10,714 || 21–47–1
|- style="background:#bfb"
| 70 || July 15 || Cubs || 8–5 || Syl Johnson (5–3) || Bill Lee (9–10) || Boom-Boom Beck (4) || 3,000 || 22–47–1
|- style="background:#bfb"
| 71 || July 16  || Pirates || 3–2 || Hugh Mulcahy (5–9) || Mace Brown (4–4) || None ||  || 23–47–1
|- style="background:#fbb"
| 72 || July 16  || Pirates || 3–7 || Bob Klinger (8–9) || Max Butcher (2–12) || Bill Swift (2) || 12,958 || 23–48–1
|- style="background:#fbb"
| 73 || July 17 || Pirates || 4–7 || Joe Bowman (6–5) || Ray Harrell (1–3) || None || 2,500 || 23–49–1
|- style="background:#bfb"
| 74 || July 18 || Pirates || 8–3 || Syl Johnson (6–3) || Bill Swift (2–2) || None || 6,000 || 24–49–1
|- style="background:#fbb"
| 75 || July 19 || Cardinals || 2–4 || Tom Sunkel (1–1) || Hugh Mulcahy (5–10) || Bob Bowman (4) || 11,554 || 24–50–1
|- style="background:#bfb"
| 76 || July 21  || Cardinals || 16–2 || Kirby Higbe (6–4) || Curt Davis (11–11) || None ||  || 25–50–1
|- style="background:#fbb"
| 77 || July 21  || Cardinals || 0–7 || Mort Cooper (6–3) || Ike Pearson (0–2) || None || 6,000 || 25–51–1
|- style="background:#fbb"
| 78 || July 22 || Reds || 0–2 || Paul Derringer (13–4) || Boom-Boom Beck (3–6) || None || 5,000 || 25–52–1
|- style="background:#fbb"
| 79 || July 23  || Reds || 2–5  || Gene Thompson (4–1) || Hugh Mulcahy (5–11) || None ||  || 25–53–1
|- style="background:#fbb"
| 80 || July 23  || Reds || 0–4 || Whitey Moore (9–6) || Max Butcher (2–13) || None || 23,840 || 25–54–1
|- style="background:#fbb"
| 81 || July 25 || @ Pirates || 4–5  || Bob Klinger (10–10) || Ike Pearson (0–3) || None || 2,539 || 25–55–1
|- style="background:#fbb"
| 82 || July 26  || @ Pirates || 1–3 || Bill Swift (4–2) || Kirby Higbe (6–5) || Mace Brown (6) ||  || 25–56–1
|- style="background:#fbb"
| 83 || July 26  || @ Pirates || 3–5 || Joe Bowman (7–5) || Boom-Boom Beck (3–7) || None || 10,611 || 25–57–1
|- style="background:#bfb"
| 84 || July 27 || @ Pirates || 9–8 || Ray Harrell (2–3) || Rip Sewell (7–7) || Kirby Higbe (1) || 2,610 || 26–57–1
|- style="background:#bbb"
| – || July 28 || @ Reds || colspan=6 | Postponed (rain); Makeup: July 29 as a traditional double-header
|- style="background:#fbb"
| 85 || July 29  || @ Reds || 0–3 || Gene Thompson (5–1) || Hugh Mulcahy (5–12) || None ||  || 26–58–1
|- style="background:#fbb"
| 86 || July 29  || @ Reds || 2–9 || Whitey Moore (10–6) || Ike Pearson (0–4) || None || 10,223 || 26–59–1
|- style="background:#fbb"
| 87 || July 30  || @ Reds || 2–9 || Bucky Walters (18–6) || Kirby Higbe (6–6) || None ||  || 26–60–1
|- style="background:#fbb"
| 88 || July 30  || @ Reds || 1–5 || Johnny Vander Meer (5–8) || Boom-Boom Beck (3–8) || None || 30,298 || 26–61–1
|-

|- style="background:#fbb"
| 89 || August 1 || @ Cubs || 2–6 || Larry French (7–5) || Kirby Higbe (6–7) || None || 7,290 || 
|- style="background:#bbb"
| – || August 2 || @ Cubs || colspan=6 | Postponed (rain); Makeup: September 14 as a traditional double-header
|- style="background:#fbb"
| 90 || August 3 || @ Cubs || 6–9 || Bill Lee (12–10) || Hugh Mulcahy (5–13) || Jack Russell (3) || 6,993 || 26–63–1
|- style="background:#fbb"
| 91 || August 4 || @ Cardinals || 8–9  || Bob Bowman (6–4) || Hugh Mulcahy (5–14) || None || 1,041 || 26–64–1
|- style="background:#fbb"
| 92 || August 5 || @ Cardinals || 1–5 || Curt Davis (15–11) || Ike Pearson (0–5) || None || 2,313 || 26–65–1
|- style="background:#fbb"
| 93 || August 6  || @ Cardinals || 0–11 || Bob Weiland (7–9) || Kirby Higbe (6–8) || None ||  || 26–66–1
|- style="background:#fbb"
| 94 || August 6  || @ Cardinals || 3–8 || Mort Cooper (8–4) || Syl Johnson (6–4) || None || 10,430 || 26–67–1
|- style="background:#bfb"
| 95 || August 8 || Dodgers || 3–2 || Hugh Mulcahy (6–14) || Red Evans (1–8) || None || 8,250 || 27–67–1
|- style="background:#fbb"
| 96 || August 10  || Dodgers || 0–3 || Luke Hamlin (13–9) || Boom-Boom Beck (3–9) || None ||  || 27–68–1
|- style="background:#bfb"
| 97 || August 10  || Dodgers || 8–3 || Ike Pearson (1–5) ||  || None || 9,000 || 28–68–1
|- style="background:#bfb"
| 98 || August 11 || @ Giants || 2–1 || Kirby Higbe (7–8) || Hal Schumacher (7–8) || None || 5,212 || 29–68–1
|- style="background:#bfb"
| 99 || August 12 || @ Giants || 4–3 || Hugh Mulcahy (7–14) || Manny Salvo (4–8) || None || 6,998 || 30–68–1
|- style="background:#fbb"
| 100 || August 13  || @ Giants || 2–11 || Bill Lohrman (10–8) || Bill Kerksieck (0–1) || None ||  || 30–69–1
|- style="background:#fbb"
| 101 || August 13  || @ Giants || 2–6 || Carl Hubbell (7–5) || Ray Harrell (2–4) || None || 10,853 || 30–70–1
|- style="background:#bfb"
| 102 || August 15 || @ Bees || 4–3 || Boom-Boom Beck (4–9) || Lou Fette (10–7) || None || 1,498 || 31–70–1
|- style="background:#fbb"
| 103 || August 16  || @ Bees || 2–9 || Bill Posedel (12–9) || Syl Johnson (6–5) || None ||  || 31–71–1
|- style="background:#bfb"
| 104 || August 16  || @ Bees || 3–2 || Hugh Mulcahy (8–14) || Danny MacFayden (7–13) || None || 4,322 || 32–71–1
|- style="background:#bfb"
| 105 || August 18 || Giants || 5–2 || Kirby Higbe (8–8) || Bill Lohrman (10–9) || None || 5,000 || 33–71–1
|- style="background:#bbb"
| – || August 19 || Giants || colspan=6 | Postponed (rain); Makeup: September 28 as a traditional double-header
|- style="background:#fbb"
| 106 || August 20  || Giants || 4–8 || Hal Schumacher (8–8) || Boom-Boom Beck (4–10) || None ||  || 33–72–1
|- style="background:#bfb"
| 107 || August 20  || Giants || 3–2 || Hugh Mulcahy (9–14) || Carl Hubbell (7–6) || None || 12,043 || 34–72–1
|- style="background:#fbb"
| 108 || August 21 || Reds || 0–7 || Johnny Niggeling (2–0) || Ike Pearson (1–6) || None || 1,000 || 34–73–1
|- style="background:#bfb"
| 109 || August 22 || Reds || 4–0 || Kirby Higbe (9–8) || Gene Thompson (8–3) || None || 2,450 || 35–73–1
|- style="background:#fbb"
| 110 || August 23 || Reds || 0–3 || Paul Derringer (16–7) || Boom-Boom Beck (4–11) || None || 3,869 || 35–74–1
|- style="background:#bfb"
| 111 || August 24 || Cardinals || 6–5 || Syl Johnson (7–5) || Bob Weiland (8–10) || None || 15,000 || 36–74–1
|- style="background:#fbb"
| 112 || August 26  || Cardinals || 0–5 || Curt Davis (18–12) || Kirby Higbe (9–9) || None ||  || 36–75–1
|- style="background:#fbb"
| 113 || August 26  || Cardinals || 4–11 || Bob Bowman (10–4) || Ike Pearson (1–7) || Clyde Shoun (7) || 12,000 || 36–76–1
|- style="background:#bfb"
| 114 || August 27  || Cubs || 4–3 ||  || Bill Lee (16–11) || None ||  || 37–76–1
|- style="background:#bfb"
| 115 || August 27  || Cubs || 3–2 || Ray Harrell (3–4) || Claude Passeau (12–10) || None || 10,029 || 38–76–1
|- style="background:#fbb"
| 116 || August 28 || Cubs || 3–5 || Charlie Root (6–7) || Syl Johnson (7–6) || None || 1,500 || 38–77–1
|- style="background:#bbb"
| – || August 29 || Cubs || colspan=6 | Postponed (rain); Makeup: September 15 as a traditional double-header in Chicago
|- style="background:#bbb"
| – || August 30 || Pirates || colspan=6 | Postponed (rain and wet grounds); Makeup: August 31 as a traditional double-header
|- style="background:#fbb"
| 117 || August 31  || Pirates || 0–1 || Max Butcher (5–15) || Kirby Higbe (9–10) || None ||  || 38–78–1
|- style="background:#bfb"
| 118 || August 31  || Pirates || 11–6 || Boom-Boom Beck (6–11) || Bob Klinger (11–15) || None || 8,000 || 39–78–1
|-

|- style="background:#fbb"
| 119 || September 1 || Bees || 0–6 || Bill Posedel (15–9) || Ray Harrell (3–5) || None || 8,674 || 39–79–1
|- style="background:#bfb"
| 120 || September 2 || Bees || 3–2 || Ike Pearson (2–7) || Hiker Moran (1–1) || Kirby Higbe (2) || 1,500 || 40–79–1
|- style="background:#fbb"
| 121 || September 3  || Bees || 3–4 || Johnny Lanning (5–4) || Syl Johnson (7–7) || None ||  || 40–80–1
|- style="background:#fbb"
| 122 || September 3  || Bees || 2–6 || Joe Sullivan (5–6) || Hugh Mulcahy (9–15) || None || 8,081 || 40–81–1
|- style="background:#fbb"
| 123 || September 4  || @ Giants || 0–10 || Hal Schumacher (10–8) || Kirby Higbe (9–11) || Jumbo Brown (6) ||  || 40–82–1
|- style="background:#fbb"
| 124 || September 4  || @ Giants || 6–7 || Jumbo Brown (4–0) || Kirby Higbe (9–12) || None || 13,039 || 40–83–1
|- style="background:#fbb"
| 125 || September 5 || @ Giants || 0–6 || Cliff Melton (11–12) || Ray Harrell (3–6) || None || 1,864 || 40–84–1
|- style="background:#fbb"
| 126 || September 6 || @ Dodgers || 1–2 || Luke Hamlin (17–11) || Ike Pearson (2–8) || None || 20,133 || 40–85–1
|- style="background:#fbb"
| 127 || September 8  || @ Dodgers || 2–11 || Bill Crouch (1–0) || Kirby Higbe (9–13) || None ||  || 40–86–1
|- style="background:#fbb"
| 128 || September 8  || @ Dodgers || 1–3  || Vito Tamulis (8–6) || Hugh Mulcahy (9–16) || None || 9,801 || 40–87–1
|- style="background:#bfb"
| 129 || September 9 || @ Bees || 2–1 ||  || Dick Errickson (4–7) || None || 1,454 || 41–87–1
|- style="background:#bbb"
| – || September 10 || @ Bees || colspan=6 | Canceled (rain and cold weather); No makeup scheduled
|- style="background:#fbb"
| 130 || September 12 || @ Cardinals || 3–4 || Bob Bowman (12–5) || Ike Pearson (2–9) || None || 1,564 || 41–88–1
|- style="background:#fbb"
| 131 || September 13 || @ Cardinals || 9–10 || Bill McGee (9–5) || Ike Pearson (2–10) || None || 1,428 || 41–89–1
|- style="background:#fbb"
| 132 || September 14  || @ Cubs || 1–13 || Charlie Root (8–8) || Boom-Boom Beck (7–12) || None ||  || 41–90–1
|- style="background:#fbb"
| 133 || September 14  || @ Cubs || 2–5 || Larry French (13–7) || Roy Bruner (0–1) || None || 5,004 || 41–91–1
|- style="background:#bfb"
| 134 || September 15  || @ Cubs || 9–6 || Kirby Higbe (10–13) || Dizzy Dean (6–4) || Syl Johnson (2) ||  || 42–91–1
|- style="background:#fbb"
| 135 || September 15  || @ Cubs || 1–6 || Vance Page (7–7) || Bill Kerksieck (0–2) || Claude Passeau (3) || 4,481 || 42–92–1
|- style="background:#fbb"
| 136 || September 16 || @ Cubs || 2–8 || Bill Lee (18–13) || Ray Harrell (3–7) || None || 4,418 || 42–93–1
|- style="background:#bfb"
| 137 || September 17  || @ Pirates || 7–3 || Syl Johnson (8–7) || Johnny Gee (0–1) || None ||  || 43–93–1
|- style="background:#fbb"
| 138 || September 17  || @ Pirates || 1–10 || Bob Klinger (14–16) || Ike Pearson (2–11) || None || 8,008 || 43–94–1
|- style="background:#fbb"
| 139 || September 18 || @ Pirates || 4–7 || Mace Brown (9–12) || Roy Bruner (0–2) || None || 688 || 43–95–1
|- style="background:#bfb"
| 140 || September 19 || @ Reds || 13–1 || Kirby Higbe (11–13) ||  || None || 3,044 || 44–95–1
|- style="background:#fbb"
| 141 || September 20 || @ Reds || 2–3 || Bucky Walters (26–10) || Boom-Boom Beck (7–13) || None || 3,581 || 44–96–1
|- style="background:#fbb"
| 142 || September 21 || @ Reds || 3–8 || Paul Derringer (23–7) || Ike Pearson (2–12) || None || 3,251 || 44–97–1
|- style="background:#fbb"
| 143 || September 23  || Dodgers || 4–22 || Tot Pressnell (9–6) || Kirby Higbe (11–14) || None ||  || 44–98–1
|- style="background:#fbb"
| 144 || September 23  || Dodgers || 0–8 || Carl Doyle (1–0) || Ray Harrell (3–8) || None || 4,000 || 44–99–1
|- style="background:#fbb"
| 145 || September 24  || Dodgers || 1–3 || Ira Hutchinson (5–2) || Syl Johnson (8–8) || None ||  || 44–100–1
|- style="background:#fbb"
| 146 || September 24  || Dodgers || 1–6 || Bill Crouch (3–0) || Roy Bruner (0–3) || None || 7,000 || 44–101–1
|- style="background:#bfb"
| 147 || September 26 || Bees || 5–3 || Kirby Higbe (12–14) || Jim Turner (4–11) || None || 200 || 45–101–1
|- style="background:#bbb"
| – || September 27 || Bees || colspan=6 | Postponed (rain); Makeup: September 3 as a traditional double-header
|- style="background:#fbb"
| 148 || September 28  || Giants || 3–4 || Harry Gumbert (17–11) || Ike Pearson (2–13) || None ||  || 
|- style="background:#fbb"
| 149 || September 28  || Giants || 3–8  || Hal Schumacher (13–10) || Ray Harrell (3–9) || None || 3,000 || 45–103–1
|- style="background:#bbb"
| – || September 29 || Giants || colspan=6 | Canceled (rain and threatening weather); No makeup scheduled
|- style="background:#fbb"
| 150 ||  || @ Dodgers || 5–14 || Bill Crouch (4–0) || Roy Bruner (0–4) || None ||  || 45–104–1
|- style="background:#fbb"
| 151 || September 30  || @ Dodgers || 1–5  || Luke Hamlin (20–13) || Boom-Boom Beck (7–14) || None || 9,431 || 45–105–1
|-

|- style="background:#fbb"
| 152 ||  || @ Dodgers || 2–3 || Hugh Casey (15–10) || Kirby Higbe (12–15) || Carl Doyle (1) || 17,152 || 
|- style="background:#bbb"
| – || October 1  || @ Dodgers || colspan=6 | Canceled (rain); No makeup scheduled
|-

| style="text-align:left;" |
The April 21, 1993, game ended after eleven innings due to darkness with the score tied 2–2, and an additional game was scheduled for September 25 which became October 1 in Brooklyn.
The second game on June 4, 1939, was called due to the Pennsylvania Sunday curfew at the end of the third inning with the score 0–2. Since the game was not yet official, it was replayed from the beginning on August 27.
The original schedule indicated single games on June 18 and 19 and July 26 at Pittsburgh. The game on June 19 was changed to a double-header on June 18 which was postponed due to rain and became a double-headers on July 26 and September 17.
The original schedule indicated single games on June 12 and July 21 with St. Louis which became a double-header on July 21.
The original schedule indicated single games on September 7 and 8 at Brooklyn which became a double-header on September 8.
The original schedule indicated single games on September 25 with Brooklyn and September 30 and October 1 at Brooklyn. September 25 became a double-header because of the April 21 tie which became a double-headers on September 30 and October 1 in Brooklyn.

Roster

Player stats

Batting

Starters by position 
Note: Pos = Position; G = Games played; AB = At bats; H = Hits; Avg. = Batting average; HR = Home runs; RBI = Runs batted in

Other batters 
Note: G = Games played; AB = At bats; H = Hits; Avg. = Batting average; HR = Home runs; RBI = Runs batted in

Pitching

Starting pitchers 
Note: G = Games pitched; IP = Innings pitched; W = Wins; L = Losses; ERA = Earned run average; SO = Strikeouts

Other pitchers 
Note: G = Games pitched; IP = Innings pitched; W = Wins; L = Losses; ERA = Earned run average; SO = Strikeouts

Relief pitchers 
Note: G = Games pitched; W = Wins; L = Losses; SV = Saves; ERA = Earned run average; SO = Strikeouts

Farm system 

LEAGUE CHAMPIONS: Pensacola

Notes

References 
1939 Philadelphia Phillies season at Baseball Reference

Philadelphia Phillies seasons
Philadelphia Phillies season
Philly